Paige Sandhu (born 1997) is a British actress. Sandhu began her acting career with appearances in Doctors and Endeavour, before being cast as Meena Jutla in the ITV soap opera Emmerdale; for her portrayal of the role, Sandhu has received critical acclaim and won the award for Best Villain at the 2021 Inside Soap Awards and Best Leading Performer at the 2022 British Soap Awards.

Early life
Sandhu was born in the 1997. After attending the Guildhall School of Music and Drama, Sandhu suffered from social anxiety, fear of judgement and fears about her future career. She moved back in with her parents and "became quite reclusive". She felt unsafe around people she did not know which led her to not leave the house much, as well as developing insomnia and various food intolerances.

Career
Sandhu made her debut television appearances in the BBC soap opera Doctors and the ITV drama series Endeavour.

In September 2020, it was announced that Sandhu had been cast in the ITV soap opera Emmerdale as Meena Jutla, the sister of established character Manpreet Sharma (Rebecca Sarker). In June 2021, it was confirmed that Meena would become a serial killer on the soap. Sandhu has received critical acclaim for her performances as Meena, and in 2021, she won the award for Best Villain at the  Inside Soap Awards, and was nominated for Best Newcomer. In 2022, she was nominated for an award in the Soap Actor category at the TRIC Awards. Sandhu has confirmed that after the conclusion of Meena's serial killer arc, she will be leaving the soap. Her final scenes aired on 18 April 2022 when she was sentenced to life imprisonment; that same day, Sandhu began filming for her next acting project.

Filmography

Awards and nominations

References

External links
 

1997 births
21st-century British actresses
Alumni of the Guildhall School of Music and Drama
British actresses of Asian descent
British actresses of Indian descent
British soap opera actresses
British television actresses
Living people
Place of birth missing (living people)
Year of birth missing (living people)